John Hatfield may refer to
John Hatfield (forger) (1758?–1803), British forger
John Hatfield (US Navy) (1795–1813), American midshipman
John Hatfield (cricketer) (1831–1889), English cricketer
John Hatfield (baseball) (1847–1909), American baseball player
Jack Hatfield (1893–1965), British swimmer and water polo player